Julián Ricardo Perujo Airala (born 18 April 1985 in Uruguay) is a Uruguayan footballer.

Career

While playing for Sud América against Montevideo Wanderers, Perujo was sent off for kicking Cristian Palacios. However, he later received a seven-game suspension for a headbutt that never happened.

References

External links
 Julián Perujo at Soccerway

Uruguayan footballers
Living people
1985 births
Association football defenders
Rampla Juniors players
Club Nacional de Football players
Defensor Sporting players
Boca Unidos footballers
Club Atlético Atlanta footballers
Sud América players
Central Español players
Racing Club de Montevideo players
Footballers from Montevideo